The FC Basel 1929–30 season was their thirty seventh season since the club's foundation on 15 November 1893. FC Basel played their home games in the Landhof in the district Wettstein in Kleinbasel. The club's new chairman was former player Otto Kuhn who took over the presidency from Hans Rupprecht at the AGM on 6 July 1929.

Overview 
The former  Hungarian international footballer Gyula Kertész was coach/manager for the second successive season. He coached the team in a total of 41 matches in their 1929–30 season. 20 of these matches were in the domestic league, 16 in the qualification round and four in the final round. Four matches were in the Swiss Cup and 17 games were friendly matches. Of these 17 friendlies three were played at home in the Landhof and the other 14 were away games. Of the 41 matches, 25 ended in a victory, six were drawn and 10 were defeats, 132 goals scored and 75 against.

At the end of the season Basel played a Scandinaviaen tour, with a visit in Germany, the first game in Leipzig and then six games in Norway. The team travelled with 15 players, the trainer Kertész and two functionaries. The journey started with a train ride on 2 June at 07:15 in the morning which arrived in Leipzig half passed eight that evening. The game against VfB Leipzig was played the following evening. The next day and ten hours the team travelled by train, train, ship, train and train again to Drammen, where a few hours later they played against a joint team Mjøndalen IF / SBK Drafn. The next day a train journey to Porsgrunn and two matches in 24 hours. The next day per bus and ship in a 48 hour journey to Bergen for a match against SK Brann. Again a ship voyage, this time to Stavanger and two games against Viking FK and a ship voyage back to Bergen. The journey ended with three train rides in three days, Bergen/Oslo/Berlin/Basel, arriving at home on 20 June. Seven games, four wins, one draw, two defeats and approximately 160 hours travelling. 

The 1929–30 Swiss Serie A was divided into three regional groups, each group with nine teams. Due to the modification in the league system in the following season. The number of teams per group is to be increased from nine to eleven and therefore there were a few small modifications this season. The teams that won each group continue to the finals as before, but now these were accompanied by the second place teams as well. Due to the foreseen increase, during this season barrage games promotion-relegation (Serie A-Serie B) were not played, were not required. Basel were allocated to the Central group together with the other three local clubs Concordia Basel, Nordstern Basel and Old Boys Basel. The other five teams allocated to this group were Young Boys Bern, FC Bern, Aarau, Grenchen and Solothurn.

FC Basel played a good league season. The good work that the trainer Gyula Kertész was making with the players was shown in the results. The first five games were won straight off, including a 5–1 in Solothurn, a 4–1 against both FC Bern and Grenchen, a 3–0 against Aarau and a 1–0 victory against local rivals Old Boys. There was a slip in the match against there closest rivals Young Boys. But the team continued their good run in the new year, beating Solothurn 4–1 and even managing a 9–2 against FC Bern. Alfred Enderlin scored four goals in that match. Basel won ten matches, four were drawn and they suffered only two defeats. They scored 46 goals and conceded 20. With 24 points they ended the group in top position, two points ahead of runners-up Young Boys. FCB and YB continued to the final group. Here Basel played against Biel-Bienne and won, but lost the three matches against Lugano, Grasshopper Club and finally Servette, who won the Swiss championship. Basel finished the championship in fourth position, level on points with Lugano and YB.

In the preliminary, first and second round of the Swiss Cup Basel were drawn at home against FC Diana Zürich in August and FC Dietikon in October, then away against Lugano in November. But their second visit to the canton of Ticino in December ended in the away defeat against FC Locarno.

Basel's top league goal scorers were Alfred Schlecht with 13 goals and Karl Bielser with 12 goals. Followed by Alfred Enderlin with 10 and Walter Müller with eight. The players Otto Meier, Paul Schaub and Leopold Wionsowsky each scored once. Karl Bielser was top scorer in the Swiss Cup with seven goals, five of these were scored in the match against FC Dietikon

Players 
Squad members

 

Players who left the squad

Results

Legend

Friendly matches

Pre- and mid-season

Winter break to end of season

Serie A

Central Group results

Central Group table

Final Group results

Final Group table

Swiss Cup

See also 
 History of FC Basel
 List of FC Basel players
 List of FC Basel seasons

References

Sources 
 Rotblau: Jahrbuch Saison 2014/2015. Publisher: FC Basel Marketing AG. 
 Die ersten 125 Jahre. Publisher: Josef Zindel im Friedrich Reinhardt Verlag, Basel. 
 FCB team 1929–30 at fcb-archiv.ch
 Switzerland 1929-30 at RSSSF

External links
 FC Basel official site

FC Basel seasons
Basel